Nash-Kelvinator Corporation was the result of a merger in 1937 between Nash Motors and Kelvinator Appliance Company. The union of these two companies was brought about as a result of a condition made by George W. Mason prior to his appointment as CEO of Nash. Nash-Kelvinator ranked 27th among United States corporations in the value of World War II production contracts.

In 1955, Kelvinator introduced the Kelvinator Food-A-Rama Side by Side Refrigerator, one of the earliest modern side-by-side frost-free refrigerators. Kelvinator consumer products, before and after the merger with Nash, were considered an upmarket brand of household appliances.

In 1954, Nash-Kelvinator acquired Hudson Motor Car Company of Detroit, Michigan, in what was called a mutually beneficial merger which formed the American Motors Corporation. Kelvinator continued as a wholly owned division within the new company.

The Kelvinator brand was sold to White Consolidated Industries in 1968, which brought the product under its corporate appliance group, joining the White-Westinghouse, Gibson, and Frigidaire appliance brands. The appliance division of White Consolidated Industries is now part of Sweden's Electrolux Corporation. The Kelvinator brand is applied to household appliances and scientific refrigeration systems.

References

Electrolux brands
Nash Motors
American Motors
Home appliance manufacturers of the United States
American companies established in 1937
Manufacturing companies established in 1937
Vehicle manufacturers of the United States